Keepers of the Faith is the fourth studio album by American beatdown hardcore band Terror. It was released in 2010 via Century Media Records.

Track list

References

Terror (band) albums
Century Media Records albums
2010 albums